Ariel Weil (born 1973 in Jerusalem, Israel) is an Israeli-born French politician who has been the Socialist Party mayor of Paris Centre (the central Paris area composed of arrondissements 1, 2, 3 and 4) since 2020. He is also an economist.

Prior to his election as mayor of Paris Centre, he had served as a borough councillor of 4th arrondissement of Paris from 2014 to 2020, and as mayor of the 4th arrondissement from 2017 to 2020.

Weil graduated from Sciences Po and Harvard Business School and is the husband of rabbi Delphine Horvilleur.

References

1973 births
Living people
21st-century French politicians
Politicians from Jerusalem
Mayors of arrondissements of Paris
Socialist Party (France) politicians
Lycée Henri-IV alumni
Sciences Po alumni
Harvard Business School alumni